No Zip Code is the fifth studio album by American country music singer David Lee Murphy. It was released on April 6, 2018, via Reviver Records. Murphy produced the album with Kenny Chesney and Chesney's longtime producer, Buddy Cannon. The album's lead single is "Everything's Gonna Be Alright", a duet with Chesney which reached #1 on the US country chart. The album's second single "I Won't Be Sorry" released to country radio in 2018.

Content
The album's lead single is "Everything's Gonna Be Alright", a duet with Kenny Chesney. Although it is Murphy's first single release in 14 years, he has written several songs for other artists in the interim. Murphy and Chesney produced the album with Chesney's longtime producer, Buddy Cannon. Murphy told Rolling Stone Country that "We took our time picking the songs from the get-go. We were under no pressure. We recorded and overdubbed at our own pace". According to MusicRow, Murphy was inspired to record an album after sending several songs that he had written to Chesney, who encouraged him to start recording again. The disc features eleven songs, all co-written by Murphy. The track "Winnebago" previously appeared on Chesney's 2016 album Cosmic Hallelujah.

Commercial performance
The album debuted as No. 35 on Billboard's Top Country Albums, and No. 20 on Independent Albums, selling 2,600 copies in the first week. It has sold 5,900 copies in the United States as of June 2018.

Track listing
"Way Gone" (D. L. Murphy, Marv Green) – 4:35
"No Zip Code" (D. L. Murphy, Jesse Murphy, Shane Minor) – 3:05
"Everything's Gonna Be Alright" (D. L. Murphy, Jimmy Yeary, Chris Stevens) – 3:49
featuring Kenny Chesney
"I Won’t Be Sorry" (D. L. Murphy, Jason Sellers, Paul Jenkins) – 4:15
"Haywire" (D. L. Murphy, Yeary) – 3:05
"As the Crow Flies" (D. L. Murphy, Dean Dillon, Jamey Johnson, Phil O’Donnell) – 3:22
"Winnebago" (D. L. Murphy) – 3:05
"Get Go" (D. L. Murphy, Brett Beavers, Jim Beavers) – 4:09
"That’s Alright" (D. L. Murphy, J. Murphy, Minor) – 3:39
"Voice of Reason" (D. L. Murphy) – 3:52
"Waylon and Willie (And a Bottle of Jack)" (D. L. Murphy, Billy Burnette) – 3:39

Personnel
Adapted from AllMusic

Jessi Alexander - background vocals
Mike Brignardello - bass guitar
Pat Buchanan - electric guitar
Tom Bukovac - electric guitar
Kenny Chesney - duet vocals on "Everything's Gonna Be Alright"
Perry Coleman - background vocals
J.T. Corenflos - electric guitar
Chad Cromwell - drums
Kenny Greenberg - acoustic guitar, electric guitar
Rob McNelley - electric guitar
David Lee Murphy - lead vocals, background vocals
Justin Ostrander - 12-string acoustic guitar, electric guitar
Danny Rader - banjo, bouzouki, acoustic guitar
Michael Rhodes - bass guitar
Mike Rojas - accordion, Hammond B-3 organ, piano, synthesizer, Wurlitzer
Scotty Sanders - steel guitar
F. Reid Shippen - programming
Chris Stevens - keyboards, programming, background vocals
Dan Tyminski - acoustic guitar, background vocals
Derek Wells - electric guitar
John Willis - banjo, dobro, acoustic guitar

Charts

References

2018 albums
David Lee Murphy albums
Albums produced by Buddy Cannon